Des Dowling is an Australian comedian, actor, writer and producer, best known for his work on Australian TV shows including The Wedge, Agony Uncles, Coxy's Big Break, Mark Loves Sharon, Kinne, Talk To the Animals and Manspace.

Career 
Dowling began his career as a news and current affairs reporter working for ABC Television, Nine Television Network and the Seven Network. He left journalism in 1997 after deciding that a career that made people laugh rather than made them cry would be a nobler profession. Dowling began his comedy career in the series Headliners where he played himself, and this led to radio work at 101.1 MIX FM and 3AW, and also to a regular spot on SEN Sports radio. Dowling has written and performed several shows at the Melbourne International Comedy Festival and performed stand-up in Canada and the UK.

He is known for his sketch comedy writing, having written and produced for the AFL Footy Show and the Logie award nominated mockumentary series Mark Loves Sharon. He currently writes for Channel 10's Family Feud

Dowling is the co-founder of the Albury-Wodonga Comedy Festival and runs his own booking agency for comedians, www.funnyguys.com.au

Personal life 
Dowling lives in rural Victoria with his wife Jen Dowling and their three children.

References

External links 

 Des Dowling on Funny Guys
 

Year of birth missing (living people)
Living people
Australian male comedians